Zelalem Bacha (born 10 January 1988) is a Bahraini long-distance runner.

In 2019, he competed in the senior men's race at the 2019 IAAF World Cross Country Championships held in Aarhus, Denmark. He finished in 90th place.

References

External links 
 

Living people
1988 births
Place of birth missing (living people)
Bahraini male long-distance runners
Bahraini male cross country runners